Thomas Kelly was an English professional footballer who played as a wing half for Sunderland.

References

English footballers
Association football wing halves
Seaham White Star F.C. players
Sunderland A.F.C. players
Murton Red Star F.C. players
Seaham Albion F.C. players
Seaham Harbour F.C. players
English Football League players
Year of birth missing
Year of death missing